DARwIn-OP (Dynamic Anthropomorphic Robot with Intelligence–Open Platform) is a miniature-humanoid robot platform developed and manufactured by Korean robot manufacturer Robotis in collaboration with Virginia Tech, Purdue University, and University of Pennsylvania. It is also supported by a $1.2 million NSF grant. DARwIn-OP has twenty degrees of freedom, each controlled by a DYNAMIXEL MX-28T servo motor.

DARwIn-OP's main purpose is for research and programmers in the fields of humanoid, artificial intelligence, gait algorithm, vision, inverse kinematics, and linguistics, among others.

DARwIn-OP is also the winner of the Kid Size League in the RoboCup 2011 2012 League, and 2013 League.

See also
 Robotis Bioloid

References

External links

  
 GitHub 

Robotics at ROBOTIS
Virginia Tech
Purdue University
University of Pennsylvania
Bipedal humanoid robots
2000s robots
Soccer robots